Robson da Silva Ourique  also known as  Robson Carioca  (born 6 September 1975 in Rio de Janeiro) is a retired Brazilian professional footballer who played for Trabzonspor and Elazığspor in the Turkish Super Lig.

References

External links
 Guardian's Stats Centre

1975 births
Living people
Olaria Atlético Clube players
Trabzonspor footballers
Elazığspor footballers
Associação Atlética Portuguesa (RJ) players
Brazilian expatriate footballers
Brazilian expatriate sportspeople in Turkey
Expatriate footballers in Turkey
Rio Branco Sport Club players
Association football forwards
Footballers from Rio de Janeiro (city)
Brazilian footballers